Lakshmi Devi Kanakala (1939/1940 – 3 February 2018) was an Indian actress, chiefly known for her roles in Telugu cinema.

Also an accomplished dancer, she worked as a trainer at Madras Film Institute and mentored such actors as Chiranjeevi, Allari Naresh, Subhalekha Sudhakar, and Suhasini. Chiranjeevi referred to her as "Saraswathi Devi (the goddess of knowledge)".

Personal life
Lakshmi Devi was married to Devadas Kanakala, a veteran Telugu actor, who appeared in numerous films over four decades. The couple had two children, Rajeev Kanakala (also an actor) and Sri Laxmi.

Death
Lakshmi Kanakala died in a private hospital in Hyderabad from cardiac arrest. She was 78 years old.

Films

Prema Bandham
Police Lockup
Kobbari Bondam as Raju's mother

References

1939 births
2018 deaths
Telugu actresses
Indian actresses
Date of birth missing
Indian acting coaches
Year of birth uncertain